Moaaz Mohamed Ibrahim (born February 8, 1999) is a Qatari athlete, specializing in the discus throw. He won the gold medal at 2016 IAAF World U20 Championships.

Retired in 2020 after marrying Rebeka Koha.

Personal bests

References

External links
 Mohamed Ibrahim Moaaz at OmRiyadat English
 

1999 births
Living people
Qatari male discus throwers
Athletes (track and field) at the 2018 Asian Games
Asian Games competitors for Qatar